Ivica Marić (born April 16, 1967 in Zenica, SR Bosnia-Herzegovina, SFR Yugoslavia) is a Croatian former professional basketball player. He was a 1.82 m point guard with good court vision.

Professional career
Marić led the 2000–01 Euroleague in assists (5.9 per game) and steals (3.7 per game) whilst playing for KK Zadar.

International career
Marić was a member of the Croatian national team that won the bronze medal in the 1995 Eurobasket.

External links 
Fibaeurope.com Profile
Euroleague.net Profile
Serie A profile  Retrieved 11 August 2015

1967 births
Living people
Basket Livorno players
Croatian men's basketball players
KK Włocławek players
KK Zadar players
KK Zrinjevac players
Lega Basket Serie A players
Pallacanestro Trieste players
Yugoslav men's basketball players
Point guards